Jack Cuthbert (born 3 September 1987 in Bristol, England) is a Scottish rugby union player for Jersey Reds in the RFU Championship. He plays as a winger/fullback or outside centre, although most of his senior appearances have come in the number 15 jersey. He has also acted as a goal kicker on occasions.

Cuthbert joined Edinburgh from Bath in the summer of 2013.

Cuthbert made his international debut for Scotland on 6 August 2011 against Ireland at Murrayfield, coming off the bench for an injured Nikki Walker, and was also called into the squad during the 2014 Six Nations Championship.

On 4 April 2016, Cuthbert moved to the Jersey Reds in the RFU Championship to play there from the 2016–17 season.

In late 2020, Cuthbert topped a poll for the best Scottish winger of the decade by a remarkable 50% margin.

References

External links
Guinness Premiership profile

1987 births
Living people
Rugby union players from Bristol
Scottish rugby union players
Bath Rugby players
People educated at Queen Elizabeth's Hospital, Bristol
Scotland 'A' international rugby union players
Scotland international rugby union players
Rugby union centres